Knut Edvard Hultgren (March 22, 1910 – October 20, 1985) was a Norwegian actor.

Hultgren was born in Helsingborg, Sweden. He performed at the New Theater and its successor, the Oslo New Theater, the People's Theater, and the National Theater in Oslo. Hultgren made his film debut in 1961 in Sønner av Norge, and he appeared in nine films altogether until 1977.

Filmography
 1961: Sønner av Norge as a member of the Norwegian Home Guard
 1961: Den anstendige skjøgen (TV)
 1964: Klokker i måneskinn as a sailor
 1965: To på topp
 1967: De blanke knappene (TV)
 1968: Rettssaka mot Leroi Jones (TV)
 1975: Olsenbandens siste bedrifter as the watchman at the East Railway Station
 1976: Den sommeren jeg fylte 15 as the priest
 1977: Karjolsteinen as the shopkeeper

References

External links
 
 Knut Hultgren at Sceneweb
 Knut Hultgren at Filmfront
 Knut Hultgren at the National Theater
 Knut Hultgren at the Swedish Film Database

1910 births
1985 deaths
20th-century Norwegian male actors
People from Helsingborg